Varagol or Vargel may refer to:
 Varagol, East Azerbaijan
 Varagol, West Azerbaijan